Franz Schubert's compositions of 1812 are mostly in the Deutsch catalogue (D) range D 13–37, and include:
 Instrumental works:
 String Quartet No. 1, D 18
 String Quartet No. 2, D 32
 String Quartet No. 3, D 36
 Vocal music:
 Klaglied, D 23

Table

Legend

List

|-
| data-sort-value="013" | 13
| data-sort-value="013" | 13
| data-sort-value="ZZZZ" |
| data-sort-value="ZZZZ" |
| data-sort-value="724,00" | VII/2, 4
| data-sort-value="Fugue, D 013" | Fugue, D 13
| data-sort-value="key D minor" | D minor
| data-sort-value="1812-01-01" | 
| For piano?; By Schubert?
|-
| data-sort-value="014" | 14
| data-sort-value="014" | 14
| data-sort-value="ZZZZ" |
| data-sort-value="ZZZZ" |
| data-sort-value="ZZZZ" |
| data-sort-value="Overture, D 014" | Overture, D 14
| data-sort-value="ZZZZ" |
| data-sort-value="1812-01-01" | 
| Piano sketch; Lost
|-
| data-sort-value="015" | 15
| data-sort-value="015" | 15
| data-sort-value="XXX,1895" | (1895)
| data-sort-value="2010,590" | XX, 10No. 590/1
| data-sort-value="407,A5" | IV, 7Anh. No. 5
| data-sort-value="Geistertanz, Der, D 015" | Der Geistertanz, D 15
| data-sort-value="text Die bretterne Kammer der Toten erbebt 1" | Die bretterne Kammer der Toten erbebt
| data-sort-value="1812-01-01" | 
| data-sort-value="Text by Matthisson, Friedrich von, Die bretterne Kammer der Toten erbebt 1" | Text by Matthisson (other settings: , 116 and 494); Fragment
|-
| data-sort-value="015.1" | 15
| data-sort-value="015.1" | 15A
| data-sort-value="XXX,1895" | (1895)
| data-sort-value="2010,590A" | XX, 10No. 590/2
| data-sort-value="407,A6" | IV, 7Anh. No. 6
| data-sort-value="Geistertanz, Der, D 015A" | Der Geistertanz, D 15A
| data-sort-value="text Die bretterne Kammer der Toten erbebt 2" | Die bretterne Kammer der Toten erbebt
| data-sort-value="1812-01-02" | 
| data-sort-value="Text by Matthisson, Friedrich von, Die bretterne Kammer der Toten erbebt 2" | Text by Matthisson (other settings: , 116 and 494); Fragment
|-
| data-sort-value="016" | 16
| data-sort-value="016" | 16
| data-sort-value="XXX,1940" | (1940)
| data-sort-value="ZZZZ" |
| data-sort-value="802,11" | VIII, 2No. 11
| data-sort-value="Counterpoint exercises, D 016" | Counterpoint exercises, D 16
| data-sort-value="key G minor A minor" | G minor (Nos. 1–4); A minor (Nos. 5–7)
| data-sort-value="1823-01-01" | 1823?
| Seven exercises in double counterpoint
|-
| data-sort-value="017" | 17
| data-sort-value="017" | 17
| data-sort-value="XXX,1940" | (1940)
| data-sort-value="ZZZZ" |
| data-sort-value="802,37" | VIII, 2No. 37
| data-sort-value="Composition exercises, D 17" | Composition exercises, D 17
| data-sort-value="text Quell' innocente figlio" | Quell' innocente figlio
| data-sort-value="1812-01-01" | 1812?
|-
| data-sort-value="018" | 18
| data-sort-value="018" | 18
| data-sort-value="XXX,1890" | (1890)
| data-sort-value="0500,001" | V No. 1
| data-sort-value="603,01" | VI, 3 No. 1
| data-sort-value="String Quartet, D 018" | String Quartet No. 1
| data-sort-value="key G minor B major" | G minor / B major
| data-sort-value="1810-01-01" | 1810–1811
| Andante, Presto vivace – Minuet – Andante – Presto
|-
| data-sort-value="019" | 19
| data-sort-value="019" | 19
| data-sort-value="ZZZZ" |
| data-sort-value="ZZZZ" |
| data-sort-value="ZZZZ" |
| data-sort-value="String Quartet, D 019" | String Quartet, D 19
| data-sort-value="ZZZZ" |
| data-sort-value="1810-01-01" | 1810–1811
| Lost
|-
| data-sort-value="019.1" | 19A
| data-sort-value="019.1" | 19A
| data-sort-value="ZZZZ" |
| data-sort-value="ZZZZ" |
| data-sort-value="ZZZZ" |
| data-sort-value="String Quartet, D 019A" | String Quartet, D 19A
| data-sort-value="ZZZZ" |
| data-sort-value="1810-01-01" | 1810–1811
| Lost
|-
| data-sort-value="999.00192" |
| data-sort-value="019.2" | 19B
| data-sort-value="ZZZZ" |
| data-sort-value="ZZZZ" |
| data-sort-value="ZZZZ" |
| data-sort-value="Waltzes and a March, D 019B" | Waltzes and a March, D 19B
| data-sort-value="ZZZZ" |
| data-sort-value="1812-01-01" | 1812–1813?
| For piano; Lost
|-
| data-sort-value="020" | 20
| data-sort-value="020" | 20
| data-sort-value="ZZZZ" |
| data-sort-value="ZZZZ" |
| data-sort-value="ZZZZ" |
| data-sort-value="Overture, D 020" | Overture, D 20
| data-sort-value="key B-flat major" |B major
| data-sort-value="1812-01-01" | 1812
| For string quartet; Lost
|-
| data-sort-value="021" | 21
| data-sort-value="021" | 21
| data-sort-value="ZZZZ" |
| data-sort-value="ZZZZ" |
| data-sort-value="ZZZZ" |
| data-sort-value="Variations, 06, D 021" | Six Variations, D 21
| data-sort-value="key E-flat major" |E major
| data-sort-value="1812-01-01" | 1812
| For piano; Lost
|-
| data-sort-value="022" | 22
| data-sort-value="022" | 22
| data-sort-value="ZZZZ" |
| data-sort-value="ZZZZ" |
| data-sort-value="ZZZZ" |
| data-sort-value="Minuets, 12, D 022" | Twelve Minuets with Trios, D 22
| data-sort-value="ZZZZ" |
| data-sort-value="1812-01-01" | 1812
| For piano; Lost
|-
| data-sort-value="023" | 23
| data-sort-value="023" | 23
| data-sort-value="131,1830-3" | 131p,3(1830)
| data-sort-value="2001,006" | XX, 1No. 6
| data-sort-value="406,04" | IV, 6No. 4
| Klaglied
| data-sort-value="text Meine Ruh ist dahin, meine Freud ist entflohn" | Meine Ruh ist dahin, meine Freud ist entflohn
| data-sort-value="1812-01-01" | 1812
| data-sort-value="Text by Rochlitz, Johann Friedrich, Meine Ruh ist dahin, meine Freud ist entflohn" | Text by Rochlitz
|-
| data-sort-value="024" | 24
| data-sort-value="024" | 24
| data-sort-value="ZZZZ" |
| data-sort-value="ZZZZ" |
| data-sort-value="ZZZZ" |
| data-sort-value="Variations, 07, D 024" | Seven Variations, D 24
| data-sort-value="key F major" |F major
| data-sort-value="1812-01-01" | 1812?
| For piano; Fragment; Lost
|-
| data-sort-value="999.00241" |
| data-sort-value="024.1" | 24A
| data-sort-value="ZZZZ" |
| data-sort-value="ZZZZ" |
| data-sort-value="724,00" | VII/2, 4
| data-sort-value="Fugue, D 024A" | Fugue, D 24A
| data-sort-value="key C major" | C major
| data-sort-value="1812-06-21" | summer1812?
| For keyboard (organ or piano); Partly reused in 
|-
| data-sort-value="999.00242" |
| data-sort-value="024.2" | 24B
| data-sort-value="ZZZZ" |
| data-sort-value="ZZZZ" |
| data-sort-value="724,00" | VII/2, 4
| data-sort-value="Fugue, D 024B" | Fugue, D 24B
| data-sort-value="key G major" | G major
| data-sort-value="1812-06-21" | summer1812?
| For keyboard (organ or piano); Two versions
|-
| data-sort-value="999.00243" |
| data-sort-value="024.3" | 24C
| data-sort-value="ZZZZ" |
| data-sort-value="ZZZZ" |
| data-sort-value="724,00" | VII/2, 4
| data-sort-value="Fugue, D 024C" | Fugue, D 24C
| data-sort-value="key D minor" | D minor
| data-sort-value="1812-06-21" | summer1812?
| For keyboard (organ or piano)
|-
| data-sort-value="999.00244" |
| data-sort-value="024.4" | 24D
| data-sort-value="ZZZZ" |
| data-sort-value="ZZZZ" |
| data-sort-value="724,00" | VII/2, 4 Anh.
| data-sort-value="Fugue, D 024D" | Fugue, D 24D
| data-sort-value="key C major" | C major
| data-sort-value="1812-06-21" | summer1812?
| For piano; Fragment; Partly reused in 
|-
| data-sort-value="999.00245" |
| data-sort-value="024.5" | 24E
| data-sort-value="ZZZZ" |
| data-sort-value="ZZZZ" |
| data-sort-value="105,A1" | I, 5 Anh.
| data-sort-value="Mass, D 024E" | Mass, D 24E
| data-sort-value="key F major" | F major?Gloria – Credo
| data-sort-value="1812-06-21" | summer1812?
| data-sort-value="Text: Mass ordinary 01" | Text: Mass ordinary (other settings: , 45, 49, 56, 66, 105, 167, 324, 452, 678, 755 and 950); For SATB and orchestra; Fragment of a Gloria and a Credo; Partly based on 
|-
| data-sort-value="025" | 25
| data-sort-value="025" | 25
| data-sort-value="ZZZZ" |
| data-sort-value="ZZZZ" |
| data-sort-value="802,00" | VIII, 2
| data-sort-value="Counterpoint exercises, D 025" | Counterpoint exercises, D 25
| data-sort-value="ZZZZ" |
| data-sort-value="1812-06-18" | started18/6/1812
| Four 2-part and three 3-part counterpoint exercises; Four 2-part imitation exercises
|-
| data-sort-value="999.00251" |
| data-sort-value="025.1" | 25A
| data-sort-value="ZZZZ" |
| data-sort-value="ZZZZ" |
| data-sort-value="802,00" | VIII, 2
| data-sort-value="Counterpoint exercises, D 025A" | Counterpoint exercises, D 25A
| data-sort-value="ZZZZ" |
| data-sort-value="1812-06-21" | summer1812?
| Two 4-part counterpoint exercises
|-
| data-sort-value="999.00252" |
| data-sort-value="025.2" | 25B
| data-sort-value="ZZZZ" |
| data-sort-value="ZZZZ" |
| data-sort-value="802,00" | VIII, 2
| data-sort-value="Counterpoint exercises, D 025B" | Counterpoint exercises, D 25B
| data-sort-value="ZZZZ" |
| data-sort-value="1812-06-21" | summer1812?
| Fifteen 3-part counterpoint exercises
|-
| data-sort-value="999.00253" |
| data-sort-value="025.3" | 25C
| data-sort-value="ZZZZ" |
| data-sort-value="ZZZZ" |
| data-sort-value="802,00" | VIII, 2
| data-sort-value="Fugue, D 025C" | Fugue, D 25C
| data-sort-value="key F major" | F major
| data-sort-value="1812-06-21" | summer1812?
| Counterpoint exercise for two voices; Fragment
|-
| data-sort-value="026" | 26
| data-sort-value="026" | 26
| data-sort-value="XXX,1886" | (1886)
| data-sort-value="0200,002" | II No. 2
| data-sort-value="505,03" | V, 5
| data-sort-value="Overture, D 026" | Overture, D 26
| data-sort-value="key D major" | D major
| data-sort-value="1812-06-26" | 26/6/1812
| For orchestra
|-
| data-sort-value="027" | 27
| data-sort-value="027" | 27
| data-sort-value="XXX,1928" | (1928)
| data-sort-value="ZZZZ" |
| data-sort-value="108,00" | I, 8
| data-sort-value="Salve Regina, D 027" | Salve Regina, D 27
| data-sort-value="key F major" | F majorSalve Regina
| data-sort-value="1812-06-28" | 28/06/1812
| data-sort-value="Text: Salve Regina 1" | Text: Salve Regina (other settings: , 223, 386, 676 and 811); For s and orchestra
|-
| data-sort-value="028" | 28
| data-sort-value="028" | 28
| data-sort-value="XXX,1923" | (1923)
| data-sort-value="ZZZZ" |
| data-sort-value="607,01" | VI, 7 No. 1
| data-sort-value="Piano Trio No. 0" | Piano Trio, D 28, a.k.a. Sonata
| data-sort-value="key B-flat major" | B major
| data-sort-value="1812-08-28" | 27/7/1812–28/8/1812
| Allegro
|-
| data-sort-value="029" | 29
| data-sort-value="029" | 29
| data-sort-value="XXX,1888" | (1888)
| data-sort-value="1100,009" | XI No. 9
| data-sort-value="724,00" | VII/2, 4
| data-sort-value="Andante, D 029" | Andante, D 29
| data-sort-value="key C major" | C major
| data-sort-value="1812-09-09" | 9/9/1812
|-
| data-sort-value="030" | 30
| data-sort-value="030" | 30
| data-sort-value="XXX,1894" | (1894)
| data-sort-value="2001,005" | XX, 1No. 5
| data-sort-value="404,00" | IV, 4
| data-sort-value="Jungling am Bache, Der, D 030" | Der Jüngling am Bache, D 30
| data-sort-value="text An der Quelle sass der Knabe 1" | An der Quelle saß der Knabe
| data-sort-value="1812-09-24" | 24/9/1812
| data-sort-value="Text by Schiller, Friedrich, An der Quelle sass der Knabe 1" | Text by Schiller (other settings:  and 638)
|-
| data-sort-value="031" | 31
| data-sort-value="031" | 31
| data-sort-value="XXX,1888" | (1888)
| data-sort-value="1400,014" | XIV No. 14
| data-sort-value="105,01" | I, 5
| data-sort-value="Kyrie, D 031" | Kyrie, D 31
| data-sort-value="key D minor" | D minorKyrie
| data-sort-value="1812-09-25" | 25/9/1812
| data-sort-value="Text: Mass ordinary 02" | Text: Mass ordinary (other settings: , 45, 49, 56, 66, 105, 167, 324, 452, 678, 755 and 950); For stSATB and orchestra; First part of a Mass
|-
| data-sort-value="032" | 32
| data-sort-value="032" | 32
| data-sort-value="XXX,1890" | (1890)(1897)(1954)
| data-sort-value="0500,002" | V No. 2XXII v5
| data-sort-value="603,04" | VI, 3 No. 4
| data-sort-value="String Quartet, D 032" | String Quartet No. 2
| data-sort-value="key C major" | C major
| data-sort-value="1812-10-01" | Sep.–Oct.1812
| Presto (publ. in 1890) – Andante – Minuet (publ. in 1890, music partly reappears in  No. 12) – Allegro con spirito (publ. partly in 1897)
|-
| data-sort-value="033" | 33
| data-sort-value="033" | 33
| data-sort-value="XXX,1940" | (1940)
| data-sort-value="ZZZZ" |
| data-sort-value="802,38" | VIII, 2No. 38
| data-sort-value="Composition exercises, D 33" | Composition exercises, D 33
| data-sort-value="text Entra l'uomo allor che nasce" | Entra l'uomo allor che nasce
| data-sort-value="1812-10-01" | Sep.–Oct.1812
| Text by Metastasio, from Isacco II, "Aria di Abramo"; Six settings (No. 1 for s, Nos. 2 for sa, No. 3 for sat, Nos. 4–6 for satb) and an Allegretto (b?), with corrections by Salieri
|-
| data-sort-value="034" | 34
| data-sort-value="034" | 34
| data-sort-value="XXX,1940" | (1940)
| data-sort-value="ZZZZ" |
| data-sort-value="802,39" | VIII, 2No. 39
| data-sort-value="Composition exercises, D 34" | Composition exercises, D 34
| data-sort-value="text Te solo adoro" | Te solo adoro
| data-sort-value="1812-11-05" | 5/11/1812
| Text by Metastasio, from Betulia liberata II, "Aria di Achior"; For satb; Two versions of start; With corrections by Salieri
|-
| data-sort-value="035" | 35
| data-sort-value="035" | 35
| data-sort-value="XXX,1940" | (1940)
| data-sort-value="ZZZZ" |
| data-sort-value="802,40" | VIII, 2No. 40
| data-sort-value="Composition exercises, D 35" | Composition exercises, D 35
| data-sort-value="text Serbate, o Dei custodi" | Serbate, o Dei custodi
| data-sort-value="1812-12-01" | Oct.–Dec.1812
| Text by Metastasio, from La clemenza di Tito I, 5; Three settings (No. 1 for satb, No. 2 for SATB, No. 3 for t and accompaniment); With corrections by Salieri
|-
| data-sort-value="036" | 36
| data-sort-value="036" | 36
| data-sort-value="XXX,1890" | (1890)
| data-sort-value="0500,003" | V No. 3
| data-sort-value="603,05" | VI, 3 No. 5
| data-sort-value="String Quartet, D 036" | String Quartet No. 3
| data-sort-value="key B-flat major" | B major
| data-sort-value="1813-02-21" | 19/11/1812–21/2/1813
| Allegro – Andante – Minuet – Allegretto
|-
| data-sort-value="037" | 37
| data-sort-value="037" | 37
| data-sort-value="074,1827" | 74(1827)
| data-sort-value="1900,001" | XIXNo. 1
| data-sort-value="303,01" | III, 3 No. 1
| data-sort-value="Advokaten, Die" | Die Advokaten
| data-sort-value="text Mein Herr, ich komm' mich anzufragen" | Mein Herr, ich komm' mich anzufragen
| data-sort-value="1812-12-27" | 25/12/1812–27/12/1812
|}

Lists of compositions by Franz Schubert
Compositions by Franz Schubert
Schubert